Puccinia campanulae is a plant pathogen that causes rust on bellflower (Campanula).

In Iceland, it is known to infect Campanula rotundifolia, on which it produces teliospores, but it has not been found to infect Campanula uniflora, the other native Campanula species in Iceland.

See also
 List of Puccinia species

References

External links
 USDA ARS Fungal Database

Fungi described in 1836
Fungal plant pathogens and diseases
Ornamental plant pathogens and diseases
campanulae
Fungi of Iceland